Purzand-e Vasat (also Romanized as Pūrzand-e Vosţá, Būrzand-e Vosţá, and Pūrzand-e Vasaţ) is a village in Lavasan-e Bozorg Rural District, Lavasanat District, Shemiranat County, Tehran Province, Iran. According to the 2006 census, its population was 35, in 8 families.

References 

Populated places in Shemiranat County